This is a list of mayors of Edmonton, a city in Alberta, Canada.

Edmonton was incorporated as a town on January 9, 1892, with Matthew McCauley acclaimed as its first mayor during the town's first election, held February 10, 1892. On October 8, 1904, Edmonton became a city during the tenure of Mayor William Short. Edmonton was part of the North-West Territories until September 1, 1905, when it became the capital of the newly created province of Alberta, during the tenure of Mayor Kenneth W. MacKenzie. The longest serving mayor is William Hawrelak, who was elected as mayor seven times, serving for a total of 10 years 4 months over three periods: four consecutive terms starting 1951, resigned in 1959 during last month of fourth term; two consecutive terms starting 1963, expelled by the courts in 1964; one term starting in 1974, died in office in 1975.

Mayors of Edmonton

 Terry Cavanagh was never elected  to the mayor's spot. Twice he sat in the mayor's chair. He was interim or acting mayor after Hawrelak's death and after Decore's resignation.

See also
List of mayors in Canada
List of mayors of Strathcona, Alberta
Timeline of Edmonton history

Notes

References

 
Edmonton